Ussara arquata is a species of sedge moth in the genus Ussara. It was described by Edward Meyrick in 1926. It is found in Colombia.

References

Moths described in 1926
Glyphipterigidae